Doubter may mean:

One who experiences doubt
A skeptic
An old type of candle snuffer